Kindred is a collaborative studio album by jazz pianist Jacky Terrasson and jazz vibraphonist Stefon Harris. The album was released on March 3, 2001 by Blue Note label. The album was nominated for Grammy Award as Best Jazz Instrumental Album.

Reception
John Murph of JazzTimes stated, "If Terrasson’s playing seemed a bit drowned out by A Paris’ arching conception, he takes no prisoners on this speedball of a CD. With Harris’ impeccable timing, pianistic ideas and love for high-speed chase, Terrasson has to turn it up a notch or two, and he does so to great effect." Matt Cibula of PopMatters noted, "These two young jazz stars... have worked hard to produce this brainy and beautiful record and have redefined the notion of jazz collaboration. I'm hoping that they hook up like this every few years to craft a series of co-led albums; they are capable of producing a series that will last longer than they do." All About Jazz review by Jim Santella commented, " Cascades from vibes and piano embellish its beautiful melody without venturing too far from the norm. Throughout their recommended collaboration, Harris and Terrasson honor the tradition of jazz without recycling it. Their creative spirit brings a promise of growth in the new year."

Track listing

Personnel
Jacky Terrasson – piano
Stefon Harris – vibraphone, marimba
Tarus Mateen – bass (tracks: 1 2 3 4 6 7 8 10)
Idris Muhammad – drums (tracks: 1 8)
Terreon Gully – drums (tracks: 2 3 4 6 7 10)

References

2001 albums
Blue Note Records albums
Collaborative albums
Stefon Harris albums
Jacky Terrasson albums